Gunnar Eyjólfsson (24 February 1926 - 21 November 2016) was an Icelandic actor.

Gunnar began his career with the Reykjavík Theatre Company in 1945. In 1961, he joined the National Theatre of Iceland; in 1963 he won the Silver Lamp Award for the best theatrical performance of the year for the title role in Pétur Gautur. He was also the first foreign recipient of the RADA Shakespeare Award.

He also appeared in many films. He won the 2002 Edda Award for Best Leading Actor for his performance as Thórður in The Sea.

In 1999, he was awarded the Knight's Cross of the Order of the Falcon.

Personal life
Gunnar was born in Keflavík. He is the father of Þorgerður Katrín Gunnarsdóttir.

Selected filmography

References

External links 

1926 births
2016 deaths
Icelandic male film actors
Knights of the Order of the Falcon